Charles Hamilton James (16 July 1738 – 9 April 1800), titled Count of Arran from 1754 onwards, was son of Charles Hamilton, Count of Arran and his wife Antoinette Courtney. His paternal grandparents were James Hamilton, 4th Duke of Hamilton and his mistress Lady Barbara FitzRoy. His great grandparents through his paternal grandmother were therefore Charles II of England and his mistress Barbara Palmer, 1st Duchess of Cleveland. Through his mother he was a descendant of the Courtenay family of Devon.

Early life
Born in Edinburgh, he spent the majority of his childhood in France and Switzerland. He was born with the surname of James rather than Hamilton. Although the reason for this is unknown, it can be assumed that after his father was sent out to France on the upcoming marriage of the Earl of Arran to Elizabeth Gerrard, his father Charles was sufficiently insulted by this to remove his family name. However, given that the surname was his father's first name, there is an element of continuity with his old family.

Military career
Charles joined the British East India Company and rose to the rank of captain. He was subsequently commissioned into the Royal Scots Greys and rose to the rank of lieutenant colonel. He served in the Seven Years' War and later in the Low Countries with his regiment, culminating in the Flanders campaign.

Title
The title "Count of Arran" was used by Charles' father. It is unclear whether Charles inherited the title, chiefly because it is not certain whether it was a genuine title or merely one he assumed while he was in France. The title is a reference to the Earldom of Arran, the subsidiary title of the Dukes of Hamilton, his grandfather's family. There is a likelihood that it was not just a courtesy title, due to his descent from the Kings of France through his mother. (Through his father's great-grandmother Henrietta Maria of France, Louis XIV would have been his father's first cousin once removed, and Louis XV his second cousin, twice removed.) There is little evidence to prove that it was a genuine French noble title, but if so, then his male line descendants, including Charles, would be entitled to be styled Comte d'Arran. Including the title, he would have been Lt Col Charles Stuart FitzRoy Douglas-Hamilton James, Comte d'Arran.

Issue
Charles married Catherine Napier, daughter of Sir Gerrard Napier, 5th Baronet of Middle March on 15 June 1760 and had two children:
Lt. Col Sir William James, Comte d'Arran, (20 May 1777 – 5 December 1820), married firstly Caroline Gordon, daughter of Hon. Lockhart Gordon (son of the 3rd Earl of Aboyne) and Hon. Catherine Wallop (daughter of Lord Lymington) on 3 May 1798, married secondly Lady Henrietta Montagu, daughter of John Montagu, 5th Earl of Sandwich and had issue by both wives.
Colonel Sir Philip Charles William FitzRoy James, Comte d'Arran (14 Mar 1801 – Jul 1871), married Susan Georgiana Ryder, daughter of Hon. Granville Dudley Ryder and Lady Georgiana Augusta Somerset, daughter of the 6th Duke of Beaufort. Colonel Sir Philip and Susan Georgiana Ryder were the ancestors of the Barrister and Academic Prof. Philip Seaforth James and the RAF Sqn Ldr and member of the Great Escape, Bertram Arthur James MC through his son, Canon Mark James.
Maria James (1818 – 17 Aug 1899), married David Erskine, 13th Earl of Buchan on 17 July 1876
Anne James married Sir St. Andrew St. John and had issue.
Sir Paulet Andrew St. John.

Literary work
Charles went on to publish a book written by his father, Transactions during the Reign of Queen Anne, from the Union to the Death of that Princess in 1790. He also wrote books of his own, The Patriot; Tragedy, altered from the Italian of Metastasio, an eight volume set in 1784; An Historical Relation of the Origin, Progress, and Final Dissolution of the Government of the Rohilla Afghans, in the Northern Provinces of Hindustan, compiled from a Persian Man, and the original papers, another eight volume set in 1787; and finally Hedaya, or Guide; a Commentary on the Mussulman Laws, translated by order of the Governor-General and Council of Bengal, a four volume set published in 1791. He published all of these books under the name Charles Hamilton.

Ancestry

References

External links
 http://thepeerage.com/p56918.htm#i569173

1738 births
1800 deaths
18th-century French nobility
18th-century English nobility
19th-century English nobility
Counts
House of Douglas and Angus
House of Hamilton
House of Stuart